Endrizzi is an Italian surname.

Notable people
 Renato Marcos Endrizzi Sabbatini (born 1947), Brazilian scientist and writer
 Luciano Endrizzi (1921–1986), Italian-Brazilian physician and surgeon
 Walter Endrizzi, Italian paralympic athlete.

Italian-language surnames